The 2012 Copa Fiat Brasil  season was the third Copa Fiat Brasil season. It began on 3 June at  Londrina and ended on November 4 at Velopark, after 12 races to be held at six meetings. In 2012 the category was renamed to Copa Fiat Brasil.

Cacá Bueno won the championship for the third time, after beat Andre Bragantini for six points.

Teams and drivers
All cars are powered by FPT engines and use Fiat Linea chassis.

Race calendar and results

Notes:
 — The second race at Londrina was transferred to July 28 at  Curitiba, but only the drivers who competed at Londrina will can run.

Championship standings
Points were awarded as follows:

Notes:
 - Allam Khodair, Clemente de Faria, Jr., Fábio Carreira and Marcos Gomes will compete at Londrina, but not participate in Curitiba round.

References

External links
Official website 

Copa Fiat Linea season
Copa Fiat Brasil